Burton S. Blumert (February 11, 1929 – March 30, 2009) was the president of the Center for Libertarian Studies in Burlingame, California, co-founder and chairman of the Mises Institute, and the publisher of LewRockwell.com. In a career that spanned almost 50 years until his retirement in 2008, he bought and sold precious metals as the proprietor of Camino Coin Company.

Background
Educated at New York University, Blumert had a series of draft deferments and then enlisted in the United States Air Force during the Korean War era.

From 1959 until 2008, Blumert operated the Camino Coin Company, dealing in bullion and coins. Upon retirement he gave the company to a long-time employee. After retiring, Blumert remained an active discussant of commodities topics in the media.

Blumert was Jewish.

Political and social commentary

In a 2008 interview he credited his experience in the coin industry as spurring him to adopt a libertarian political philosophy and to support fellow gold advocate Ron Paul. In 1988, Blumert was chairman of Ron Paul's first presidential campaign. Blumert was a close friend and supporter of the late Murray Rothbard, with whom he founded the Center for Libertarian Studies in 1975. As president of the Center for Libertarian Studies, Blumert published the Journal of Libertarian Studies, the Austrian Economics Newsletter, and the Rothbard-Rockwell Report. Blumert served as chairman of the Ludwig von Mises Institute and was publisher of LewRockwell.com (LRC).

References

External links
 Burton Blumert archive at LewRockwell.com

1929 births
2009 deaths
20th-century American male writers
20th-century American non-fiction writers
21st-century American male writers
21st-century American non-fiction writers
American columnists
American libertarians
American male non-fiction writers
American political writers
Critics of neoconservatism
Deaths from cancer in the United States
Jewish American writers
Mises Institute people
Monetary reformers
New York University alumni
Non-interventionism
People from Burlingame, California
United States Air Force airmen
Writers from Brooklyn
20th-century American Jews
21st-century American Jews